Miguel Ángel González González (born 14 March 1980), commonly known as Migue, is a Spanish former professional footballer who played as a central defender.

Club career
Born in Terrassa, Barcelona, Catalonia, Migue played youth football for FC Barcelona, but only represented its C team as a senior. Released in 2001 he joined Sporting de Gijón, but his output for the main squad consisted of one Copa del Rey appearance.

From 2003 to 2008, Migue competed in the Segunda División B, representing several clubs including hometown's Terrassa FC. At the end of the 2007–08 season he helped another side in his native region, Girona FC, promote to Segunda División after a 49-year absence.

Migue appeared in his first game as a professional on 30 August 2008 at the age of 28, featuring 72 minutes in a 1–0 away win against RC Celta de Vigo. During his six-year spell in the second tier at the Estadi Montilivi, he never played less than 33 matches.

Migue alternated between divisions two and three the following years, representing Deportivo Alavés, Huracán Valencia CF, Cádiz CF and CE Sabadell FC. On 30 August 2019, the 39-year-old announced his retirement and returned to Girona as youth system coordinator.

References

External links

1980 births
Living people
Spanish footballers
Footballers from Terrassa
Association football defenders
Segunda División players
Segunda División B players
Tercera División players
FC Barcelona C players
Sporting de Gijón B players
Sporting de Gijón players
CE Mataró players
UE Figueres footballers
Terrassa FC footballers
Girona FC players
Deportivo Alavés players
Huracán Valencia CF players
Cádiz CF players
CE Sabadell FC footballers